Isectolophidae is a potentially paraphyletic family of browsing, herbivorous, mammals in the Perissodactyla suborder Ancylopoda that show long, curved and cleft claws.

Chalicotheres
Prehistoric mammal families